The Battle of Curalaba is a 1598 battle and ambush where Mapuche people led by Pelantaru soundly defeated Spanish conquerors led by Martín García Óñez de Loyola at Curalaba, southern Chile. In Chilean historiography, where the event is often called the Disaster of Curalaba, the battle marks the end of the Conquest of Chile (la conquista) period in Chile's history, although the fast Spanish expansion in the south had already been halted in the 1550s. The battle contributed to unleash a general Mapuche uprising that resulted in the Destruction of the Seven Cities. This severe crisis reshaped Colonial Chile and forced the Spanish to reassess their mode of warfare.

History

On December 21, 1598, governor Martín García Oñez de Loyola traveled to Purén leading 50 men. On the second day they camped in Curalaba without taking protective measures. The Mapuche people, aware of their presence, with their cavalry led by Pelantaru and his lieutenants, Anganamón and Guaiquimilla, with three hundred men, shadowed his movements and made a surprise night raid. Completely surprised, the governor and almost all of his soldiers and companions were killed.

This event was called the Disaster of Curalaba by the Spaniards. It not only involved the death of the Spanish governor, but the news rapidly spread among the Mapuche and triggered a general revolt, long-prepared by the toqui Paillamachu, that destroyed Spanish camps and towns south of the Bío-Bío River over the next few years.

See also
 List of battles won by Indigenous peoples of the Americas

References

Sources 
 Vicente Carvallo y Goyeneche, Descripcion Histórico Geografía del Reino de Chile (Description Historical Geography of the Kingdom of Chile), PDF E Libros from Memoria Chilena (History of Chile 1542–1788)
 Tomo I History 1542–1626, Tomo 8 de Colección de historiadores de Chile y de documentos relativos a la historia nacional. Santiago : Impr. del Ferrocarril, 1861. Primera parte. Tomo I; Capítulo LXXIX. Llega a Chile un refuerzo de tropa del Perú – Levanta el Gobernador una ciudad en la provincia de Cuyo – Visita el país meridional de su gobernacion, i los indios le quitan la vida.

Conflicts in 1598
Battles involving Spain
Battles of the Arauco War
1598 in the Captaincy General of Chile
History of Araucanía Region